Ayce Cordy (born 6 August 1990) is a former professional Australian rules footballer who played with the Western Bulldogs in the Australian Football League (AFL). The Bulldogs used their first-round selection, 14th overall, to secure Cordy after  bid their first-round selection (pick 13) for him. Cordy's father, Brian, played 124 games for the Bulldogs in the 1980s. His brother, Zaine, currently plays for the Saints. Playing 27 games for the Western Bulldogs, Cordy was delisted at the end of the 2015 season.

Cordy crossed to Williamstown in the VFL after being delisted, although he had already played for Williamstown from 2009–13 while on the Western Bulldogs list as part of the alignment between the two clubs. He played for Williamstown in 2016–2017 before transferring to Melbourne University in 2018. Cordy played a total of 75 games and kicked 81 goals for Williamstown.

References

External links

Australian rules footballers from Victoria (Australia)
Living people
1990 births
People educated at Geelong College
Geelong Falcons players
Western Bulldogs players
Place of birth missing (living people)
Williamstown Football Club players